"Send a Little Love My Way" is a song written by Henry Mancini and Hal David and performed by Anne Murray.  The song reached #6 on the Canadian Adult Contemporary chart and #10 on both the Canadian country chart the U.S. Adult Contemporary chart in 1973.  The song appeared on her 1974 album, Love Song.  The song was produced by Brian Ahern.

In 1973 the song was nominated for a Golden Globe Award for Best Original Song.  The song was featured in Oklahoma Crude.

Chart performance

Anne Murray

References

1973 singles
Songs with lyrics by Hal David
Songs with music by Henry Mancini
Anne Murray songs
Song recordings produced by Brian Ahern (producer)
Capitol Records singles